Hlubočec is a municipality and village in Opava District in the Moravian-Silesian Region of the Czech Republic. It has about 600 inhabitants.

History
The first written mention of Hlubočec is from 1487.

References

External links

Villages in Opava District